Michaël Van Hoey (born 8 September 1982) is a Belgian football player who plays in the central defence. He currently plays for Waasland-Beveren.

Van Hoey previously played for Lokeren in the Belgian First Division.

References

https://int.soccerway.com/players/michael-van-hoey/53698/

K.S.C. Lokeren Oost-Vlaanderen players
1982 births
Belgian footballers
Living people
Association football defenders